Bokaro Airport  is a domestic airport owned by the Steel Authority of India Limited (SAIL) and operated by the Airport Authority of India (AAI). The airport was included in the UDAN regional connectivity scheme and will start its commercial operations from June 2023.

History 
The airport was built in the late 1960s to handle private flights for operations of the Steel Authority of India Limited (SAIL). It began operating as a private airport until 2010. In the mid-2010s, the former Chief Minister of Jharkhand, Raghubar Das drafted a plan to develop this airport to handle scheduled commercial flights. For this, he and the former Minister of State for Civil Aviation, Jayant Sinha, jointly laid the foundation for the airport's expansion. The development work included resurfacing and strengthening of the existing runway, apron, taxiways, including grading of the operational area, along with the provision of expendable low-cost terminal building, installation of Air Traffic Control (ATC) tower, ESS building, watch tower, night landing facilities on the runway and other ancillary works which are now almost completed.

Features 
It was built at a cost of ₹ 75 crore by the Airport Authority of India (AAI), and will be managed by the BSL once it is commissioned for commercial operations.

Infrastructure 
The boundary wall of the airport from Sector 12 is completed. After completion of boundary wall, a perimeter road was constructed. Other works including the runway, terminal building, access road, drainage system and passenger lodges have been completed in the expansion work being done for commercial air service from the airport. At least 6000 trees were axed, while over 1000 trees were transplanted for the expansion of the airport. With an investment of ₹ 8 crore, the Air Traffic Control (ATC) tower was built by Airport Authority of India (AAI), and the advantage of this tower is that it is a mobile tower which can be moved at any location while its height is also adjustable, according to the requirements.

See also 
 Birsa Munda Airport
 Dumka Airport
 Dhalbhumgarh Airport
 List of airports in India
 List of airports in Jharkhand

References 

Airports in Jharkhand